In graph theory, a threshold graph is a graph that can be constructed from a one-vertex graph by repeated applications of the following two operations:
 Addition of a single isolated vertex to the graph.
 Addition of a single dominating vertex to the graph, i.e. a single vertex that is connected to all other vertices.

For example, the graph of the figure is a threshold graph. It can be constructed by beginning with a single-vertex graph (vertex 1), and then adding black vertices as isolated vertices and red vertices as dominating vertices, in the order in which they are numbered.

Alternative definitions
An equivalent definition is the following: a graph is a threshold graph if there are a real number  and for each vertex  a real vertex weight  such that for any two vertices ,  is an edge if and only if . 

Another equivalent definition is this:  a graph is a threshold graph if there are a real number  and for each vertex  a real vertex weight  such that for any vertex set ,  is independent if and only if 

The name "threshold graph" comes from these definitions: S is the "threshold" for the property of being an edge, or equivalently T is the threshold for being independent.

Threshold graphs also have a forbidden graph characterization: A graph is a threshold graph if and only if it no four of its vertices form an induced subgraph that is a three-edge path graph, a four-edge cycle graph, or a two-edge matching.

Decomposition
From the definition which uses repeated addition of vertices, one can derive an alternative way of uniquely describing a threshold graph, by means of a string of symbols.  is always the first character of the string, and represents the first vertex of the graph. For example, the string  represents a star graph with three leaves, while  represents a path on three vertices. The graph of the figure can be represented as

Related classes of graphs and recognition
Threshold graphs are a special case of cographs, split graphs, and trivially perfect graphs. A graph is a threshold graph if and only if it is both a cograph and a split graph.  Every graph that is both a trivially perfect graph and the complementary graph of a trivially perfect graph is a threshold graph. Threshold graphs are also a special case of interval graphs.  All these relations can be explained in terms of their characterisation by forbidden induced subgraphs.  A cograph is a graph with no induced path on four vertices, P4, and a threshold graph is a graph with no induced P4, C4 nor 2K2.  C4 is a cycle of four vertices and 2K2 is its complement, that is, two disjoint edges.  This also explains why threshold graphs are closed under taking complements; the P4 is self-complementary, hence if a graph is P4-, C4- and 2K2-free, its complement is as well.

 showed that threshold graphs can be recognized in linear time; if a graph is not threshold, an obstruction (one of P4, C4, or 2K2) will be output.

See also
 Indifference graph
 Series–parallel graph
Threshold hypergraphs

References

. 
. 2nd edition, Annals of Discrete Mathematics, 57, Elsevier, 2004. 
.
.

External links
Threshold graphs, Information System on Graph Classes and their Inclusions.

Graph families
Perfect graphs